The International Electric Propulsion Conference (IEPC) in its current form is a biennial academic conference in the field of electric space propulsion and hosted by the Electric Rocket Propulsion Society (ERPS). It was originally organized by the American Rocket Society (ARS) and later by the American Institute of Aeronautics and Astronautics (AIAA) as a US-American national conference and was expanded starting in 1976 to its current international character with the joining of international space engineering societies. Currently, few hundred engineers and scientists join the conference and present and discuss the latest developments and research results regarding electric propulsion.

List of electric propulsion conferences

Proceedings of the recent conferences are available on the website of the ERPS: IEPC archive.

External links
Electric Rocket Propulsion Society
Conference paper archive

Academic conferences